Kjell Sørensen (8 August 1930 – 25 June 2012) was a Norwegian sports shooter. He competed in the trap event at the 1968 Summer Olympics.

References

External links
 

1930 births
2012 deaths
Norwegian male sport shooters
Olympic shooters of Norway
Shooters at the 1968 Summer Olympics
People from Lillestrøm
Sportspeople from Viken (county)
20th-century Norwegian people